The Renegades of Pern is a science fiction novel by the American-Irish author Anne McCaffrey. It was the tenth book published in the Dragonriders of Pern series. It was first published in 1989.

Like Nerilka's Story, The Renegades of Pern is a departure from the normal perspective for the Dragonrider books, presenting a parallel viewpoint, this time running concurrent with the original trilogy; the book begins at the time of Dragonflight and ends a little after the ending of The White Dragon.  It tells several stories, tied together by the figure of Thella, renegade sister of Larad (Lord Holder of Telgar Hold). The exploration of the Southern Continent and discovery of ancient human relics there (including the activities of Piemur and Menolly from the Harper Hall trilogy) also figure in the novel, which ends where All the Weyrs of Pern begins.

Notes

References

External links

1989 fantasy novels
1989 science fiction novels
Dragonriders of Pern books
Novels by Anne McCaffrey
Del Rey books
Books with cover art by Michael Whelan